Shaken and Stirred: The David Arnold James Bond Project is an album of cover versions of James Bond film themes organized and produced by David Arnold. Featuring contemporary rock and electronic artists of the time, it was compiled by Arnold in 1997 and released on East West Records in the United Kingdom and Sire Records in the United States. Following this project, Arnold would go on to compose the music for a number of Bond films.

John Barry, the composer of many of the themes on the album, was complimentary about Arnold's interpretation of his work; "He was very faithful to the melodic and harmonic content, but he's added a whole other rhythmic freshness and some interesting casting in terms of the artists chosen to do the songs. I think it's a terrific album. I'm very flattered."

A version of "You Only Live Twice" by Björk was recorded but not included on the album. It is available as a free download from bjork.com. Arnold had previously collaborated with Björk on the 1993 song "Play Dead". The arrangement of "You Only Live Twice" was also recorded with Natacha Atlas and released in 1999 as a B-side of the single "One Brief Moment", also produced by Arnold.

The Japanese release of the album also includes an orchestral version of "The James Bond Theme", which is identified as a "Bonus track for Japan".

The album peaked at #11 in the UK Albums Chart. Two singles were released from the album in the UK: "On Her Majesty's Secret Service" and "Diamonds Are Forever", which reached #7 and #39 in the UK Singles Chart respectively.

In an episode of BBC Radio 4's programme Desert Island Discs, the television presenter Kevin Fong chose the Propellerheads version of On Her Majesty's Secret Service as one of his tracks.

Track listing

Diamonds Are Forever (Single)

On Her Majesty's Secret Service (Single)

See also
 Outline of James Bond

References

James Bond music
Covers albums
Tribute albums
1997 soundtrack albums
East West Records soundtracks
David Arnold soundtracks